Sagara Dananjaya (born 6 September 1981) is a Sri Lankan former cricketer. He played in 80 first-class and 57 List A matches between 1998/99 and 2004/05. He made his Twenty20 debut on 17 August 2004, for Sri Lanka Air Force Sports Club in the 2004 SLC Twenty20 Tournament.

References

External links
 

1981 births
Living people
Sri Lankan cricketers
Singha Sports Club cricketers
Sri Lanka Air Force Sports Club cricketers
Place of birth missing (living people)